Ogden Stadium, also known as Ogden Pioneer Stadium, is a multi-purpose stadium located within Lorin Farr Park in Ogden, Utah. The stadium itself seats around 20,000, but is not currently used for any of the four "major" United States sports.

History 
Citizens of Ogden, including representatives of the American Legion and Elks organizations, incorporated a committee in April 1928 to coordinate construction of a stadium. In February 1929, cost was estimated at $65,000. The following month, the City of Ogden agreed to support the effort, along with Weber Junior College and local school boards. The stadium was initially scheduled to open in the fall of 1929, with a college football game between the BYU Cougars and the Agricultural College of Utah (now the Utah State Aggies). In August, $75,000 was raised via bond sales, with the first game moved back, expected to feature Weber Junior College and the McKinley School of Honolulu in late October. In mid-October, during the Wall Street Crash of 1929, the city effectively took over the stadium effort by creating a stadium board and agreeing to finance construction.

Construction of the stadium began on June 9, 1930. The stadium was completed during the summer of 1930, and was first used on August 15, for a fireworks show and big bands to celebrate the start of an athletics meet sponsored by the Union Pacific Railroad. Lighting was in place weeks later, as the Utah State freshman squad defeated Weber Junior College in a night game on October 10.

The stadium hosted various college football contests, including games with the Idaho State Bengals, Nevada Wolf Pack, and Utah Utes. It was also used as a boxing venue, featuring champions such as Max Baer, Ezzard Charles, Gene Fullmer, and Joey Maxim.

Current usage 
An annual event held here is "Hot Rockin' 4th", an annual event held around the Fourth of July, which includes demolition derbies and exhibition of monster trucks and rock crawlers. Country music performances and a small funfair and a classic car show are held in conjunction with the Hot Rockin' 4th event.

The stadium also plays host to the Ogden Pioneer Days Rodeo, which is held every year during the week of Utah's Pioneer Day.

Notes

References

Sports venues in Ogden, Utah
Buildings and structures in Ogden, Utah
Multi-purpose stadiums in the United States
1930 establishments in Utah
Sports venues completed in 1930